The Funchal Cable Car, or Madeira Cable Car, is a gondola lift that transports people from the lower section of Funchal, Madeira to the suburb of Monte.

History
The route of the cable car was chosen to replace the old Monte Railway, which ran from 1886 to 1943.

Construction of the cable car system began in September 1999; it was opened in November 2000 and has been in service since then.  The bottom station is located at Almirante Reis Park in central Funchal. The length of the cable car line is 3,718 m and the height difference 560 m; the journey takes approx. 15 minutes. The cableway has over 39 cabins with 8 seats each, and can transport up to 800 passengers per hour.

References

External links
 https://web.archive.org/web/20150330233418/http://www.telefericodofunchal.com/index_UK.html

Gondola lifts
Aerial tramways
Aerial tramways in Portugal
Transport in Madeira
Funchal
2000 establishments in Portugal